One Hour of Happiness is a 1931 German drama film directed by William Dieterle and starring Dieterle, Evelyn Holt, and Harald Paulsen.

It was released by the German branch of Universal Pictures.

Synopsis
Two workers in a department store see an attractive but poverty-stricken newspaper seller looking through the window at the goods inside. As part of a game they decide to give her gifts of items in the shop, but she doesn't realize that they are only pretending.

Cast

References

Bibliography

External links 
 

1931 films
Films of the Weimar Republic
German drama films
1931 drama films
1930s German-language films
Films directed by William Dieterle
Films set in department stores
Universal Pictures films
German black-and-white films
1930s German films